Tseng Chung-ming was a Taiwanese physician and politician. He was the Deputy Minister of Health and Welfare from 2013 to 2015, and had previously served in the same position within the Ministry of the Interior.

Education
Tseng obtained his bachelor's degree from Soochow University in 1979 and master's degree from National Chengchi University in 1981.

Political career
Tseng worked in various positions at the Kaohsiung City Government from September 1983 to October 1986. From October 1984 until March 1994, he held various positions at the Taipei City Government. In March 1994, he moved to the Ministry of the Interior (MOI). Tseng was the deputy director of the Department of Social Affairs of the MOI from February 1999 to February 2006. He then served as the director of the Department of Social Affairs of the MOI from February 2006 to March 2009.

Death
Tseng died on 21 June 2015 at the age of 60 at Taipei Veterans General Hospital due to cirrhosis and lung cancer.

References

2015 deaths
Government ministers of Taiwan
Deaths from lung cancer
Deaths from cirrhosis
21st-century Taiwanese politicians
Deaths from cancer in Taiwan
20th-century Taiwanese politicians
1950s births
Soochow University (Taiwan) alumni
National Chengchi University alumni